Polish names in space

Moon
 Armiński (crater)
 Gadomski (crater)
 Kepínski (crater)
 Lubiniezky (crater)
 Copernicus (lunar crater)

Mercury
 Boznańska crater
 Chopin (crater)
 Kobro crater
 Komeda crater
 Mickiewicz (crater)

Venus
 Badarzewska crater
 Jadwiga crater
 Janina crater
 Konopnicka crater
 Landowska crater
 Nalkowska crater
 Olesnicka crater
 Wanda (crater)
 Zosia crater

Mars
 Copernicus (Martian crater)
 Grójec crater
 Puławy crater

Asteroids
 198820 Iwanowska
 199950 Sierpc
 279377 Lechmankiewicz
 471143 Dziewanna (TNO)

Stars
 Solaris (star)

Exoplanets 
 Pirx (planet)

External links 
 https://polskiobserwator.de/lifestyle/polskie-slady-na-marsie/
 http://naukawpolsce.pap.pl/aktualnosci/news%2C390820%2Ctrzy-nowe-planetoidy-otrzymaly-polskie-nazwy.html
 https://www.tvp.info/7958935/trzy-planetoidy-otrzymaly-polskie-nazwy

Space program of Poland
Astronomical nomenclature by nation
 space